The Kcskehát Limestone is a Jurassic geologic formation in Hungary. Indeterminate fossil Sauropod tracks have been reported from the formation. It is abundant on Illite and very little Kaolinite that indicates a change from the humid-subtropical climate of the Mecsek Coal Formation to the monsoon-like semi-arid climate of the Pliensbachian formations. The dominance of illite indicates a relatively fast erosion of the source area and a moderate input of terrigenous clastics relative to the underlying formations.

Vertebrate paleofauna

Dinosaurs 
Indeterminate sauropod remains once misattributed to the Cetiosauridae are present in the province of Kecskemét, Hungary.

See also 
 List of dinosaur-bearing rock formations
 List of stratigraphic units with sauropodomorph tracks
 Indeterminate sauropodomorph tracks

References

Bibliography 
  

Geologic formations of Hungary
Jurassic System of Europe
Pliensbachian Stage
Limestone formations
Ichnofossiliferous formations
Paleontology in Hungary